Alessandra Finesso (born 23 July 1956 in Milan) is an Italian former swimmer who competed in the 1972 Summer Olympics.

References

External links
 
 
 

1956 births
Living people
Swimmers from Milan
Italian female backstroke swimmers
Olympic swimmers of Italy
Swimmers at the 1972 Summer Olympics
Mediterranean Games medalists in swimming
Mediterranean Games gold medalists for Italy
Swimmers at the 1971 Mediterranean Games
20th-century Italian women